Fort Russell Township is located in Madison County, Illinois, in the United States. As of the 2010 census, its population was 9,146 and it contained 3,903 housing units. With Moro, Meadowbrook, and Holiday Shores being notable communities within the Township.

History
Fort Russell Township takes its name from Fort Russell (est. 1812), which was named for Col. William Russell.

Geography

Demographics

References

External links
City-data.com
Illinois State Archives

Townships in Madison County, Illinois
Townships in Illinois